Finding Sally is a 2020 Canadian political autobiographical documentary television film directed by Ethiopian-Canadian director Tamara Mariam Dawit and produced by Isabelle Couture. The film received positive reviews from critics.

The film is based on the mysterious life of the Sally, an Ethiopian aristocrat-turned-communist-rebel. She was the aunt of director Tamara Dawit. Sally disappeared after the Ethiopian revolution which lead to the overthrow of Emperor Haile Selassie. The film has been shot in Ethiopia.

The film had been scheduled to premiere at the 2020 Hot Docs Canadian International Documentary Festival; however, following the cancellation of the festival due to the COVID-19 pandemic in Canada, it was one of the films selected for CBC Television's special Hot Docs at Home series, in which it premiered on April 30, 2020.

In 2021, the film was nominated for the Best Documentary Program at the 9th Canadian Screen Awards. Before that, the film also has nominated for the Best Documentary at the Durban International Film Festival in 2020. It was also nominated for the Audience Award at the Internationales Frauen Film Fest.

Cast 
 Tsehai Tesfamichael 
 Abrehet Asefa 
 Tamara Mariam Dawit 
 Kibre Dawit 
 Tsion Dawit 
 Brutawit Dawit 
 Menbere Dawit  
 Ferkete Gerbremariam 
 Ashenafi Kersma 
 Brur Gebrai

References

External links 
 

2020 television films
Canadian documentary television films
2020s Canadian films